Moundou is the second largest city in Chad and is the capital of the region of Logone Occidental.

The city lies on the Mbéré River (a tributary of the Western Logone) some 475 kilometres south of the capital N'Djamena. It is the main city of the Ngambai people. Moundou has grown as an industrial centre, home to the Gala Brewery, which produces Chad's most popular beer and the cotton and oil industries.

History 
The city was created on 8 November 1923 by the French sergeant and administrator Joseph-François Reste, Lieutenant-General of Chad from 1923 to 1926 and future Governor General of French Equatorial Africa, 
 who, from the whaleboat upon which he navigated the Logone, found the site pretty. By 1916, the military conquest of Chad was completed, however movements of resistance to the colonial regime took place. It was especially in the southwest of the country that dissensions continued until about 1930. He decided to found the post of Moundou in the centre of the rebellious zone. The rebellious situation did not change much with the arrival of Lieutenant Robert Reverdy. Chief of the district of the Middle Logone in 1925, Reverdy, who became a director in 1927, completed an uninterrupted stay for five years and eight months. He moved the chief town of the district to Moundou in 1927. Riding the country, on horseback and by litter, he subjected the organisation of strong chieftains, first of village then of township.

On 20 April 1930, Governor Georges Prouteaux of Oubangi-Chari (the district was attached to Oubangui-Chari in 1926) signed a decision reorganising the "indigenous of the Middle Logone" by creating 40 cantons, divided into five subdivisions. Reverdy had his right-hand man, local chief Hassan Moundou or Hassan Baguirmi, of Baguirmian or rather Baguirmianised Dekakire Arab origin, installed as chief of the township of Moundou. Not all chiefs were of traditional origin. In the animist country, custom only recognised clan chiefs or war or initiation leaders, who were strictly specialised and temporary. However, the system was accepted by the population, and some chiefs remained in office for more than a quarter of a century. Their descendants are still in place today.

Reverdy (called Baoguel, the "Left-Handed", in the Ngambay language) urbanised the post of Moundou that he established. He planted the flowers (from February to May) that line the roads of Moundou, which became the origin of the nickname of the city during the colonial period, "Moundou-la-Rouge".

In 1926 the Cotton Company of the Congo installed a ginning factory in Moundou. The cotton company later became Cotonfran in 1928 and then CotonTchad in 1972.

The first cadastral map of the town of Moundou was manufactured on 2 February 1926. Since there were not, at the time, the materials for substantial topographical surveys, the drainage pipeline of the town was facing the river in the belief that the natural inclination would head toward the river, when in reality the river level is higher than the level of the city. In 2012, the mayor of Moundou, Laoukein Kourayo Médard, said that "every time there was a flood, all the waters of the Logone discharged to Lake Wey (in the West), which in turn sprays its water into the city, flooding Moundou entirely."

Geography

Climate 
Like other parts of southern Chad and the East Sudanian savanna, Moundou has a typical tropical savanna climate (Köppen Aw), with a wet season and a dry season and the temperature being hot year-round. The hottest time of year is from March to May, just before the wet season starts.

Moundou receives  of rain over 85 precipitation days, with a distinct wet and dry season like most tropical savanna climates. December and January receive no precipitation at all, with almost no rain falling from November to March. August, the wettest month, receives  of rainfall on average. August also has 19 precipitation days, which is the most of any month. Humidity is much higher in the wet season than the dry season, with February having a humidity at just 28% and August having a humidity at 81%. Moundou receives 2810.4 hours of sunshine annually on average, with the sunshine being distributed fairly evenly across the year, although it is lower during the wet season. December receives the most sunshine, while August receives the least.

Municipal districts 
There are four quarters or municipal districts of Moundou, further subdivided into 20 neighbourhoods:
 First district:
 DOMBAO neighbourhood
 DOYON neighbourhood
 TAYE neighbourhood (also spelt Tayeh)
 BEBANDJI neighbourhood
 KOUDJIRIKO neighbourhood
 NGARA neighbourhood
 Second district:
 NGUELBE neighbourhood
 BAGUIRMI neighbourhood
 BOURNOU neighbourhood
 HAUSA neighbourhood
 Third district:
 GUELKOURA neighbourhood
 QUINZE ANS (fifteen years) neighbourhood
 DOUMBEUR I neighbourhood (also spelt Dombeur)
 DOHERI neighbourhood
 MBAGUE neighbourhood
 Fourth district:
 MBOMBAYA neighbourhood
 GUELDJEM neighbourhood
 DOMBEUR II neighbourhood (also spelt Doumbeur)
 KOUTOU GUELMBAGUE neighbourhood
 MADANA neighbourhood

Demographics

Economy 
The city has an industry of ginning and processing of cotton (oil and soap) under CotonTchad. The export of cotton was done before the discovery of oil, the current main source of income for Chad. Cotton cultivation has been funded by French corporations (through the CCCE, now the AFD, and the public company Dagris, now Geocoton) and the European Development Fund of the European Union.

The city has also a historical beer industry through the Brasseries du Logone and the Gala brand, synonymous with luxury beer in Chad and in Cameroon.

Cigarettes are made in the city by the Manufacture des Cigarettes du Tchad (MCT) company.

Transports 
Moundou is situated on one of the main roads in southern Chad. The road runs from Léré on the border with Cameroon, through Pala, Kélo, Moundou, Doba, Koumra and Sarh.

The town is served by Moundou Airport , with a paved runway.

Education 
Moundou is home to several schools and, since 2002, a higher education institution, the University of Moundou (fr), which was created by ordinance No. 013 / PR / 2008 of 5 March 2008. The current university used to be the Moundou University Institute of Business Techniques or IUTEM (Institut universitaire des techniques d'entreprise de Moundou) which was created by Law No. 10 / PR / 02 of 2 September 2002.

Primary schools 
 Ecole Taye
 Ecole Doumbeur II
 CEG Communautaire de Doumbeur 2
 Centre Scolaire de Ku-Jéricho
 Ecole Officielle de Belle Vue de Moundou (Ecole Belle Vue)
 Ecole du Centre
 Ecole d'application de Moundou
 Ecole Quinze Ans
 Ecole Dombao

Secondary schools 
 Lycée Adoum d'Allah (public)
 Notre Dame College of Chad (closed)
 Lycée Technique Commercial de Moundou
 Lycée-Collège de l'Amitié (LYCAM)
 Lycée Djarabé
Lycée Palais Du Savoir de Moundou
Lycée Guelkol
CEG No. 2
College du Lac Taba
Ecole Enfants Unis
Lycée Le Héros
Lycée Communal
Collège Evangelique Gary

Other schools 
 Ecole des Sourds de Moundou

Places of worship    
Among the places of worship, they are predominantly Muslim mosques.   There are also Christian churches and temples : Roman Catholic Diocese of Moundou (Catholic Church), Evangelical Church of Chad, Christian Assemblies in Chad (Plymouth Brethren).

Twin towns/sister cities
Moundou is twinned with:
  Poitiers, France since 1990

See also 
Sacred Heart Cathedral, Moundou

References 

 
Logone Occidental Region
Populated places in Chad
Logone River
Populated places established in 1923
1923 establishments in Africa